The following is the complete list of private and government-owned universities and colleges in Iloilo City and Iloilo province, Philippines as of October 23, 2009:

A
ABE International College of Business and Economics-Iloilo - Mabini St., Iloilo City Proper
ACSI College Iloilo (Formerly: ACSI Business and Computer School) - JM Basa St., Iloilo City Proper
AMA Computer College-Iloilo - Rizal St., Iloilo City Proper
ABBA Institutes of technology
Asian College of Aeronautics - Sambag, Jaro, Iloilo City

C
Cabalum Western College - Dr. Fermin Caram Sr. Avenue, Iloilo City Proper
Central Philippine University - Lopez Jaena St., Jaro, Iloilo City
Colegio de San Jose - E. Lopez St., Jaro, Iloilo City
Colegio del Sagrado Corazon de Jesus - General Hughes St., Iloilo City Proper
Computer College of the Visayas – Mabini St., Iloilo City Proper

D
De Paul College - E. Lopez St., Jaro, Iloilo City
Dominican College of Iloilo - Aldeguer St., Iloilo City Proper

F
FAST Aviation Academy Inc. - Iloilo (School of Aeronautics)- Rizal St., Jaro, Iloilo City

G
Gov. Angel Medina Foundation College - Panes, Passi City, Iloilo
Great Saviour College - Luna St., La Paz, Iloilo City

I
Iloilo Doctors' College - West Avenue, Molo, Iloilo City
Iloilo Doctors' College of Medicine - West Avenue, Molo, Iloilo City
Iloilo State College of Fisheries
Main Campus - Barotac Nuevo, Iloilo
Barotac Nuevo Campus - Barotac Nuevo, Iloilo
Dingle Campus - Dingle, Iloilo
Dumangas Campus - Dumangas, Iloilo
San Enrique Campus - San Enrique, Iloilo
Iloilo State University of Science and Technology - Barotac Nuevo, Iloilo
Integrated Midwives Association of the Philippines Foundation School of Midwifery - La Paz, Iloilo City
Interface Computer College -Iloilo - Mabini St., Iloilo City Proper

J
John B. Lacson Foundation Maritime University
Arevalo - Sto. Niño Sur, Arevalo, Iloilo City
Molo - M.H. Del Pilar St., Molo, Iloilo City
Molo - RRLS ICT Academy formerly JBLFMU I.T Training Center

N
New Lucena Polytechnic College - New Lucena, Iloilo
Northern Iloilo State University formerly Northern Iloilo Polytechnic State College
Barotac Viejo Campus - Barotac Viejo, Iloilo
Ajuy Campus - Ajuy, Iloilo
Batad Campus - Batad, Iloilo
Concepcion Campus - Concepcion, Iloilo
Estancia, Iloilo -Main Campus Estancia, Iloilo
Lemery Campus - Lemery, Lemery, Iloilo
Victorino Salcedo Polytechnic College - Sara, Iloilo

P
Passi City College - Passi City, Iloilo

S
St. Anne College of Iloilo - Molo, Iloilo City
St. Paul University Iloilo - Iloilo City Proper
St. Therese-MTC College
Magdalo (Main)- La Paz, Iloilo City
La Fiesta - Molo, Iloilo City
Tigbauan - Tigbauan, Iloilo
St. Vincent College of Business and Accountancy - Pototan, Iloilo
St. Vincent College of Science and Technology - Leganes, Iloilo
St. Vincent Ferrer Seminary - Jaro, Iloilo City
STI College-Iloilo - Cor. Gen. Luna-Iznart Sts., Iloilo City Proper
Santa Isabel College of Iloilo City, San Jose St., Jaro, Iloilo City

U
University of Iloilo – PHINMA - Iloilo City Proper
University of San Agustin
Main Campus - Gen. Luna St., Iloilo City Proper
Satellite Campus - Sambag, Jaro, Iloilo City
University of the Philippines Visayas
Main Campus - Miagao, Iloilo
Iloilo City Campus - Iloilo City Proper

W
West Visayas State University
Main Campus - La Paz, Iloilo City
Calinog Campus - Calinog, Iloilo
Janiuay Campus - Janiuay, Iloilo
Lambunao Campus - Lambunao, Iloilo
Pototan Campus - Pototan, Iloilo
Western Institute of Technology - Luna, La Paz, Iloilo City
Iloilo Science and Technology University formerly Western Visayas College of Science and Technology
Main Campus - La Paz, Iloilo City
Barotac Nuevo Campus - Barotac Nuevo, Iloilo
Dumangas Campus - Dumangas, Iloilo
Leon Campus - Leon, Iloilo
Miagao Campus - Miagao, Iloilo

References

 
Iloilo